Barry "Armyan" Bernstein (born August 12, 1947) is an American film producer, director and screenwriter.  He is the co-founder and chairman of film company Beacon Pictures.

Career 
Bernstein has produced, executive produced, written or directed more than 40 films, including Air Force One, The Hurricane (which he also co-wrote), Spy Game, The Family Man, The Guardian, Children of Men, the Dawn of the Dead remake, Bring It On, Open Range, Thirteen Days, A Lot Like Love, Firewall and End of Days. Films he has produced via Beacon Pictures include Ladder 49, Raising Helen, For Love of the Game and The Water Horse.

In television, Bernstein was the Executive Producer of the TNT series Agent X and the ABC series Castle, created by Andrew Marlowe, who wrote Air Force One and End of Days for Beacon.

Bernstein also produced the Broadway musical Bring It On, which was nominated for a Tony for Best Musical.

Bernstein has received many awards including being honored as Showest Producer of the Year, and winning the USC Scripter Award for his screenplay for The Hurricane.

He is also the founder and chairman of the upcoming sports league, The People's Games.

Bernstein founded Beacon Communications in 1990 with his college fraternity brother, Tom Rosenberg, who now has his own successful film company, Lakeshore Entertainment, which won an Academy Award for Best Picture for Million Dollar Baby.

Bernstein was also a partner with Charlie Lyons and the Ascent Entertainment Group which owned the Denver Nuggets, Colorado Avalanche, On-Command and Spectravision.

Other films produced by Bernstein and Beacon Pictures include The Commitments, A Midnight Clear, A Thousand Acres, Sugar Hill, Playing God, Princess Caraboo, The Road to Wellville and A Life in the Theatre, which won a cable ACE Award for Best Drama.

Armyan was born and raised in Chicago, and attended the University of Wisconsin. He was a broadcast journalist with PBS and then with ABC. He wrote the disco film Thank God It's Friday. He then wrote and co-produced Francis Ford Coppola's One from the Heart. Bernstein made his directing debut with Windy City, from his screenplay, which starred John Shea and Kate Capshaw. He also co-wrote and directed Cross My Heart, starring Martin Short and Annette O'Toole. He also wrote and produced ABC's Emmy Award–winning The Earth Day Special.

Personal life 
Armyan Bernstein was born into a Jewish family, the youngest of Lynne and Armand Bernstein's two children. He is married to Christine Meleo.

Filmography

Film 

Producer only

Executive producer only

Television

References

External links

Armyan Bernstein – Details
Armyan Bernstein – Channel 4 Film

American film producers
American film directors
American male screenwriters
20th-century American Jews
English-language film directors
Living people
1947 births
21st-century American Jews